The 2020 European Speed Skating Championships were held from 10 to 12 January 2020 at the Thialf in Heerenveen, Netherlands.

Schedule 
All times are local (UTC+1).

Medal summary

Medal table

Men's events

Women's events

References

External links
Results

2020
 
2020 in Dutch sport
2020 in speed skating
Sports competitions in Heerenveen
International speed skating competitions hosted by the Netherlands
January 2020 sports events in the Netherlands